Hippomaninae are plants of the family Euphorbiaceae. It is a subtribe of the Hippomaneae and has 32 genera:

 Actinostemon
 Adenopeltis
 Anomostachys
 Balakata
 Bonania (also called Hypocoton)
 Colliguaja
 Conosapium
 Dalembertia (also called Alcoceria)
 Dendrocousinsia
 Dendrothrix
 Ditrysinia
 Duvigneaudia
 Excoecaria (also called Commia, Glyphostylus)
 Falconeria
 Grimmeodendron
 Gymnanthes (also called Adenogyne, Ateramnus)
 Hippomane (also called Mancanilla, Mancinella)  
 Mabea
 Maprounea (also called Aegopicron, Aegopricon, Aegopricum)
 Microstachys
 Neoshirakia (also called Shirakia)
 Pleradenophora
 Pseudosenefeldera
 Rhodothyrsus
 Sapium (also called Carumbium, Gymnobothrys, Sapiopsis, Seborium, Stillingfleetia, Taeniosapium), Chinese tallow
 Sclerocroton
 Sebastiania (also called Clonostachys, Cnemidostachys, Elachocroton, Gussonia, Microstachys, Sarothrostachys, and Tragiopsis)
 Senefeldera
 Senefelderopsis
 Shirakiopsis
 Spegazziniophytum
 Spirostachys
 Stillingia (also called Gymnostillingia)
 Triadica

External links
 Nationaal Herbarium Netherlands

 
Plant subtribes